The members of the National Executive Committee of the African National Congress elected at the 52nd national conference in 2007 in Polokwane, will serve until the next national conference in 2012.

A new resolution increased the number of seats in the NEC from 60 to 86, and mandated that at least half of the NEC be composed of female members. Former deputy president of South Africa Jacob Zuma beat president of South Africa Thabo Mbeki for the position of president of the ANC.

Officials

Body

Ex officio members: Nelson Mandela and Thabo Mbeki.

References

List
ANC